Roman Vladimirovich Burtsev (born April 13, 1971), known as The Kamensky Chikatilo, is a Russian serial killer and pedophile. Between 1993 and 1996, he raped and strangled six young children: five girls and one of the victims' brother. He committed all of the crimes in his hometown.

Modus operandi 
Burtsev differed from similar murderers, in that he carefully hid the victims' bodies. All bodies, except one, were found only after his arrest. He was recognized as sane, and psychiatrist Alexander Bukhanovsky said that Burtsev was one of the most brilliant murderers he ever had to deal with.

The first murders 
Roman Burtsev committed his first double murder on September 5, 1993, his victims being siblings 12-year-old Yevgeny Churilov and 7-year-old Olesya Churilova. The perpetrator met the children near a dump in the Zavodsky settlement. He wanted to rape the girl and, to get rid of the superfluous observer, killed Churilov, inflicting three blows to the boy's head with his fists and three more with a metal plate. Then he raped and strangled the girl, leaving the children's corpses in a garbage pit.

Victims 
 September 15, 1993 - Yevgeny Churilov (12) and Olesya Churilova (7).
 July 17, 1994 - Marina Alexeyeva (12)
 May 23, 1995 - Anya Kulinkina (9). He seized the girl by force, raping and then killing her on the bank of the Donets.
 July 1, 1996 - Ira Ternovskaya (9)
 July 16, 1996 - Natasha Kirbabina (12)

Personality 
Burtsev was born on April 13, 1971 in a family of alcoholics. He was an introvert, and did not stand out from other children. He later explained the rape of children by the desire to "try virginity", and the murders as the unwillingness to be discovered.

Arrest, trial and sentence 
It was the desire to hide his crimes that drove Burtsev. After one of the crimes, he asked an elderly woman who lived nearby for a spade, with which he buried the corpse and then threw away. Subsequently, the woman described in detail the appearance of the suspicious person. It was mentioned that a girl, whom Burtsev did not manage to drag away, helped catch the criminal.

Burtsev confessed to everything immediately after his arrest. The court sentenced him to death, which was later replaced by life imprisonment. He is serving his sentence in the White Swan prison (in Solikamsk, Perm Krai). Burtsev wrote letters to the "Russian Birch" Foundation, where he asked for help with medicines, because the local MCH didn't always have the necessary drugs, and when they did the number of them was limited. He wrote that he had a whole bunch of diseases, including hemorrhoids, prostatitis, avitaminosis, varicose veins and nail fungus.

In the media 
 The episode "Triangle of Death" from the series "Unexplained, but fact" (2005).
 Dashing nineties "The heirs of Chikatilo" (2007).
 "The moment of truth" (December 3, 2012)

See also
 List of Russian serial killers

References

External links 
 Article about Roman Burtsev on the site of the Prosecutor's Office of the Rostov Oblast
 Biography of Roman Burtsev on serialkillers.ru.

1971 births
Inmates of White Swan Prison
Living people
Male serial killers
Prisoners sentenced to death by Russia
Russian murderers of children
Russian people convicted of child sexual abuse
Russian rapists
Russian serial killers